N,O-Dimethyl-4β-(2-naphthyl)piperidine-3β-carboxylate (DMNPC) is a piperidine based stimulant drug which is synthesised from arecoline. It is similar to nocaine in chemical structure, and has two and a half times more activity than cocaine as a dopamine reuptake inhibitor. However it is also a potent serotonin reuptake inhibitor, with similar affinity to fluoxetine.

Clearly it is not just the SS enantiomer of the title compound that is an active MAT inhibitor.

Effect of N-demethylation
For the SR enantiomer, increased DAT affinity is seen upon demethylation.

This is the same choice of isomer used in the production of Paxil.

Simplification
A substantially simpler method that ablates the carbomethoxy ester substituent can be found by D. Koch in Ex2:

See also 
 1-Methyl-3-propyl-4-(p-chlorophenyl)piperidine
 Naphthylamphetamine
 Naphyrone
 List of cocaine analogues

References 

4-Phenylpiperidines
Serotonin–dopamine reuptake inhibitors
Stimulants
2-Naphthyl compounds